Scaevola is a genus of flowering plants in the Goodenia family, Goodeniaceae. It consists of more than 130 species, with the center of diversity being Australia and Polynesia. There are around 80 species in Australia, occurring throughout the continent, in a variety of habitats. Diversity is highest in the South West, where around 40 species are endemic.

Common names for Scaevola species include scaevolas, fan-flowers, half-flowers, and naupaka, the plants' Hawaiian name. The flowers are shaped as if they have been cut in half. Consequently, the generic name means "left-handed" in Latin. Many Hawaiian legends have been told to explain the formation of the shape of the flowers. In one version a woman tears the flower in half after a quarrel with her lover. The gods, angered, turn all naupaka flowers into half flowers and the two lovers remained separated while the man is destined to search in vain for another whole flower.

Scaevola is the only Goodeniaceae genus that is widespread outside of Australia. In at least six separate dispersals, about 40 species have spread throughout the Pacific Basin, with a few reaching the tropical coasts of the Atlantic and Indian Oceans.

The Hawaiian Islands are home to ten Scaevola species, nine of which are endemic. Eight of the indigenous species are the result of a single colonization event. Scaevola glabra and Scaevola taccada arrived separately to produce a total of three colonizations of Hawaii by Scaevola. Some of the endemic species are of hybrid origin.

Beach naupaka (Scaevola taccada synonym S. sericea) occurs throughout the Pacific and Indian Oceans and is considered an invasive species in Florida, USA, and in some islands of the Caribbean including the Cayman Islands and the Bahamas. Beachberry or Inkberry (Scaevola plumieri) is widespread along the Atlantic coast of the tropical Americas and Africa; however, it is becoming rarer in areas where S. taccada is displacing native coastal plants. 

Most Australian Scaevola have dry fruits and sprawling, herbaceous to shrubby habits. By contrast, nearly all species outside Australia have shrub habits with fleshy fruit making dispersal by frugivores easy.{ 

The plant pathogenic sac fungus Mycosphaerella scaevolae was discovered on a Scaevola fan-flower.

In Europe, Scaevola aemula is a fairly common container- and bedding plant, usually grown as an annual.

Taxonomy
The genus Scaevola was first described by Carl Linnaeus in 1771. He did not explain the origin of the genus name. It is considered to allude to the one-sided shape of the flower, which has a five-lobed tubular corolla;  in Latin means 'left-handed'. Linnaeus created the genus for a species he had previously described as Lobelia plumieri, which is thus the type species. Linnaeus did not explicitly use the specific epithet plumieri in combination with the genus Scaevola; the combination Scaevola plumieri was first published by Martin Vahl in 1791.

Species

, Plants of the World Online accepted the following species:

Scaevola acacioides Carolin
Scaevola aemula R.Br.
Scaevola albida (Sm.) Druce
Scaevola amblyanthera F.Muell.
Scaevola anchusifolia Benth.
Scaevola angulata R.Br.
Scaevola angustata Carolin
Scaevola archeriana L.W.Sage
Scaevola arenaria E.Pritz.
Scaevola argentea Carolin
Scaevola auriculata Benth.
Scaevola balansae Guillaumin
Scaevola ballajupensis L.W.Sage
Scaevola barrierei A.S.Wulff & Munzinger
Scaevola basedowii Carolin
Scaevola beckii Zahlbr.
Scaevola brookeana F.Muell.
Scaevola browniana Carolin
Scaevola bursariifolia J.M.Black
Scaevola calendulacea (Andrews) Druce
Scaevola calliptera Benth.
Scaevola canescens Benth.
Scaevola × cerasifolia Skottsb.
Scaevola chamissoniana Gaudich.
Scaevola chanii K.M.Wong
Scaevola chrysopogon Carolin
Scaevola coccinea Däniker
Scaevola collaris F.Muell.
Scaevola collina J.M.Black ex E.L.Robertson
Scaevola coriacea Nutt.
Scaevola crassifolia Labill.
Scaevola cuneiformis Labill.
Scaevola cunninghamii DC.
Scaevola cylindrica Schltr. & K.Krause
Scaevola densifolia Carolin
Scaevola depauperata R.Br.
Scaevola enantophylla F.Muell.
Scaevola eneabba Carolin
Scaevola erosa Guillaumin
Scaevola floribunda A.Gray
Scaevola gaudichaudiana Cham.
Scaevola gaudichaudii Hook. & Arn.
Scaevola glabra Hook. & Arn.
Scaevola glabrata Carolin
Scaevola glandulifera DC.
Scaevola globosa (Carolin) Carolin
Scaevola globulifera Labill.
Scaevola glutinosa Carolin
Scaevola gracilis Hook.f.
Scaevola graminea Ewart & A.H.K.Petrie
Scaevola hainanensis Hance
Scaevola hamiltonii K.Krause
Scaevola hobdyi W.L.Wagner
Scaevola hookeri F.Muell. ex Hook.f.
Scaevola humifusa de Vriese
Scaevola humilis R.Br.
Scaevola kallophylla G.J.Howell
Scaevola kilaueae O.Deg.
Scaevola laciniata F.M.Bailey
Scaevola lanceolata Benth.
Scaevola linearis R.Br.
Scaevola longifolia de Vriese
Scaevola macrophylla (de Vriese) Benth.
Scaevola macropyrena I.H.Müll.
Scaevola macrostachya Benth.
Scaevola marquesensis F.Br.
Scaevola micrantha C.Presl
Scaevola microcarpa Cav.
Scaevola microphylla Benth.
Scaevola mollis Hook. & Arn.
Scaevola montana Labill.
Scaevola muluensis K.M.Wong
Scaevola myrtifolia (de Vriese) K.Krause
Scaevola neoebudica Guillaumin
Scaevola nitida R.Br.
Scaevola nubigena Lauterb.
Scaevola obovata Carolin
Scaevola oldfieldii F.Muell.
Scaevola oppositifolia Roxb.
Scaevola ovalifolia R.Br.
Scaevola oxyclona F.Muell.
Scaevola paludosa R.Br.
Scaevola parvibarbata Carolin
Scaevola parviflora K.Krause
Scaevola parvifolia F.Muell. ex Benth.
Scaevola pauciflora Leenh.
Scaevola paulayi Fosberg
Scaevola phlebopetala F.Muell.
Scaevola pilosa Benth.
Scaevola platyphylla Lindl.
Scaevola plumieri (L.) Vahl
Scaevola porocarya F.Muell.
Scaevola porrecta A.C.Sm.
Scaevola procera Hillebr.
Scaevola pulchella Carolin
Scaevola pulvinaris K.Krause
Scaevola racemigera Däniker
Scaevola ramosissima (Sm.) K.Krause
Scaevola repens de Vriese
Scaevola restiacea Benth.
Scaevola revoluta R.Br.
Scaevola sericophylla F.Muell. ex Benth.
Scaevola socotraensis H.St.John
Scaevola spicigera Carolin
Scaevola spinescens R.Br.
Scaevola striata R.Br.
Scaevola subcapitata F.Br.
Scaevola taccada (Gaertn.) Roxb.
Scaevola tahitensis Carlquist
Scaevola tenuifolia Carolin
Scaevola thesioides Benth.
Scaevola tomentosa Gaudich.
Scaevola tortuosa Benth.
Scaevola verticillata Leenh.
Scaevola virgata Carolin
Scaevola wrightii (Griseb.) M.Gómez
Scaevola xanthina K.A.Sheph. & Hislop

Notes

References
  (2003): Phylogenetics of the genus Scaevola (Goodeniaceae): implication for dispersal patterns across the Pacific Basin and colonization of the Hawaiian Islands. Am. J. Bot. 90(6): 915–213. PDF fulltext Supplemental data

 
Asterales genera
Pantropical flora